Song for Our Daughter is the seventh studio album by British singer-songwriter Laura Marling. It was released on 10 April 2020. It was co-produced by Marling with longtime collaborator Ethan Johns. The album's title is figurative, with Marling writing to a fictional daughter.

Song for Our Daughter was shortlisted for the 2020 Mercury Prize and was nominated for Best Folk Album at the 63rd Annual Grammy Awards.

Background and themes 
Marling described the album as "stripped of everything that modernity and ownership does to it... essentially a piece of me". The songs are written to an imaginary child, with Marling stating it allowed her to offer her "all the confidences and affirmations I found so difficult to provide myself". Marling was inspired by Maya Angelou's book Letter to My Daughter (2009), which she read a few years before the album's release.

Writing and recording 
The songs on the album were all written by Marling. However, the title track and "For You" feature additional songwriting by George Jephson, while "The End of the Affair" features additional songwriting Blake Mills, who produced Marling's previous album Semper Femina (2017).

The songs were demoed in Marling's basement studio in her home in London. The album was co-produced by Marling with longtime collaborator Ethan Johns and was primarily recorded at Monnow Valley Studio. Johns previously produced Marling's albums I Speak Because I Can (2010), A Creature I Don't Know (2011) and Once I Was an Eagle (2013). The album was mixed by Ethan Johns and by Dom Monks, who previously completed engineering on I Speak Because I Can, engineering on A Creature I Don't Know, as well as recording and additional production on Once I Was an Eagle. Additional recording and mixing were done at Ethan Johns' Three Crows studio.

Music and lyrics 
Compared to her previous album, Song for Our Daughter features more sparse and starkly minimal arrangements to create an intimate sound. Laura Marling's vocals are accompanied mostly by acoustic guitar and light percussion, but are backed at times by piano and string arrangements. The string arrangements were arranged by Rob Moose. Marling also employs intricate harmony vocals on the album, including her layered vocal harmonies on "Held Down".

"Alexandra" was inspired by Leonard Cohen's song "Alexandra Leaving". Marling's song is about her fascination with Cohen's attitudes towards women. In an interview with Far Out Magazine, she explained, "He writes about women in such a beautiful way. It doesn't aggravate me that he lived the way he wanted to live. In fact, I think it's very brave of people to live that way." "Only the Strong" borrows a line from Robert Icke's play Mary Stuart, which Marling wrote the music for. "Blow by Blow" is a piano ballad written in homage to Paul McCartney. "Song for Our Daughter" was influenced by Marling's recent studies in psychoanalysis and concerns "innocence being taken away prematurely" and preparing "the next generation in a way that you weren't". "Fortune" is about a powerless woman unable to escape her circumstance, and is inspired by Marling's mother's "running away fund" that she has never used. "The End of the Affair" is about the "infinite" nature of love and the "idea of a private mourning of love" which cannot be shared. The song's title is a reference to Graham Greene's novel of the same name. "For You" is a love song inspired by McCartney, and features Marling's boyfriend playing guitar. It was recorded at home "on the fly" on her laptop and is included on the album in its original demo form.

Release 
The album was initially scheduled for an August 2020 release, however the date was moved forward to 10 April 2020 due to the COVID-19 pandemic. Marling herself commented on this, stating she "saw no reason to hold back on something that, at the very least, might entertain, and at its best, provide some sense of union". "Held Down" was released as a single on 5 April 2020, alongside the album's announcement. The album was released physically (on CD and both standard and marbled vinyl LP) on 10 July 2020.

Critical reception 

Song for Our Daughter was met with widespread critical acclaim. At Metacritic, which assigns a normalised rating out of 100 from reviews from professional critics, the album received a score of 88, based on 20 reviews. According to Metacritic, it was the 9th best-reviewed album of 2020. Aggregator AnyDecentMusic? gave it 8.6 out of 10, based on their assessment of the critical consensus.

Ella Kemp of NME called the album "a graceful ode to resilience... it's an absolute triumph". Alexis Petridis of The Guardian described it as being "alternately intimate, sneering and sad, and lavished with gorgeous melodies"; it was ultimately named album of the week. Neil McCormick of The Daily Telegraph called the album Marling's "most measured and mature work" and praised her "skillful guitar playing" and "exquisite" harmonies. In a perfect score review for Record Collector, Oregano Rathbone called the album "so uncannily, unreasonably and astutely beautiful that it meticulously sets aside every last one of your emotional checks and balances to wrap your core in a firm embrace." In her review for Mojo, Jude Rogers praised the album's production and Rob Moose's string arrangements, and wrote that Marling's "voice has never been better, each syllable a shining pool of water, clear, vivid and beautiful." Steven Edelstone of Paste called it "simultaneously Marling's most straightforward, musically simplistic record to date and her most beautiful release yet." Laura Stanley of Exclaim! wrote, "Marling remains at the top of her game." Tom Hull was somewhat less impressed, saying Marling has "never sounded more like Joni Mitchell, although my favorite Mitchell albums have a bit more spunk."

In the review for AllMusic, Timothy Monger claimed that "At just 30 years old and with seven albums to her credit, Marling's songwriting has been honed to a level of literate maturity that few artists achieve in their careers."

Year-end lists

Awards and nominations

Track listing 

Notes
  signifies an additional songwriter

Personnel 
Credits adapted from the album's liner notes.

 Laura Marling – vocals, acoustic guitar, electric guitar, güiro, slide guitar, production
 Ethan Johns – drums, continuum fingerboard, resonator guitar, shaker, Moog, production, mixing
 Nick Pini – bass, bowed double bass
 Dan See – drums
 Anna Corcoran – piano
 Chris Hillman – pedal steel guitar
 Gabriela Cabezas – cello
 Dom Monks – loops, mixing
 Rob Moose – string arrangements
 Edie Phillips – recording assistant 
 Justin Tyler Close – photography
 Vance Wellenstein – graphic design
 Theresa Adebiyi – creative direction

Charts

References 

2020 albums
Laura Marling albums
Chrysalis Records albums
Partisan Records albums
Albums produced by Ethan Johns